Djama Rabile Goad or  Jama Rabile Ghod; born 1942), also known as Djama Rabile Got was a Somali statesman (politician) of the former Somali Republic and Somali Democratic Republic. He was a respected figure with a long career of serving his people and nation.

History 
He was born in Borama, Awdal, and belongs to the Bahabr Muse (Bahabar Muuse), Mahamed 'Ase (Maxamed Case) section of the Gadabursi (Gadabuursi) or Samaron (Samaroon) clan. In his early years he went to the elementary and intermediate schools in Borama and Amud, Somalia. His secondary education he received at Amud and Sheikh (1957–1961). For his higher education he went to the United States, Wesleyan University (1961–1965) where he received his B.A. for Economics & Statistics and University of Massachusetts (1968–1969) where he received his M.A. for Economics.

After he finished his education at the University of Massachusetts he went back to the capital of the Somali Democratic Republic or Somalia and started his career by joining the Ministry of Planning (1965–1968). Later on after he acquired his M.A. he came on to become the Director of Planning Section of the Ministry of Planning and Coordination (1969–1970). Excelling in his work he managed to become the Director-General of the Ministry of Planning (April 1970 – March 1973), which he served as for 3 years. Later on he also came to serve his country as Director-General of the Ministry of Livestock, Forestry and Ranges (March 1973 – Dec. 1974), Secretary of State or Minister for Tourism and National Parks. (Dec. 1974 – Jan. 1976) and Adviser to the Revolutionary Council Economic Committee (Jan. 1976 – July 1980).

Education 
 Elementary and Intermediate:  Borama and Amud
 Secondary: Amud and Sheikh (1957–1961)
 Higher: Wesleyan University (1961–1965) and University of Massachusetts (1968-1969)

Dipl. 
 B.A. for Economics & Statistics (1965) 
 M.A. for Economics. (1969)

Career 
 Part of Ministry of Planning (1965–1968)
 Director of Planning Section of the Ministry of Planning and Coordination (1969–1970)
 Director-General of the Ministry of Planning (April 1970 – March 1973)
 Director-General of the Ministry of Livestock, Forestry and Ranges (March 1973 – Dec. 1974)
 Secretary of State or Minister for Tourism and National Parks. (Dec. 1974 – Jan. 1980)
 Adviser to the Revolutionary Council Economic Committee (Jan. 1976 – July 1976).

References 

1942 births
Year of death missing
Gadabuursi
Somalian politicians